Sarenjeh-ye Zivdar (also Romanized as Sarenjeh-ye Zīvdār; also known as Sīrīnjeh, Sarenjeh-ye Zeyvehdār, and Zeyvehdār) is a village in Afrineh Rural District, Mamulan District, Pol-e Dokhtar County, Lorestan Province, Iran. At the 2006 census, its population was 641, in 132 families.

References 

Towns and villages in Pol-e Dokhtar County